Marcus Davenport (born September 4, 1996) is an American football outside linebacker for the Minnesota Vikings of the National Football League (NFL). He played college football at UTSA. He was drafted by the New Orleans Saints in the first round of the 2018 NFL Draft.

Early years
Davenport attended John Paul Stevens High School in San Antonio, Texas, where he played high school football. Barely recruited out of high school, he chose to play college football at University of Texas at San Antonio (UTSA) over UNLV. Davenport graduated from UTSA in 2017.

College career
Davenport played at UTSA from 2014 to 2017. As a senior in 2017, he was the Conference USA Defensive Player of the Year after recording 55 tackles and 8.5 sacks. During his career, he had 185 tackles and 21.5 sacks.

Collegiate statistics

Professional career

New Orleans Saints

2018
Davenport was drafted by the New Orleans Saints in the first round (14th overall) of the 2018 NFL Draft. He was the second defensive end to be selected that year, behind only Bradley Chubb. The pick used to select Davenport was acquired from the Green Bay Packers. On May 10, 2018, Davenport signed his rookie contract with the Saints, worth $13.7 million. On June 11, 2018, it was reported that Davenport injured his thumb and that it would require surgery. In Week 3, against the Atlanta Falcons, Davenport recorded his first career sack in the victory. In Week 8, against the Minnesota Vikings, he recorded a two-sack performance in the victory.

2019
In a Week 2 matchup against the Los Angeles Rams, Davenport sacked Jared Goff as the Saints lost 27–9.
In a Week 5 game against the Tampa Bay Buccaneers, Davenport sacked Jameis Winston twice in the 31–24 win.
In week 13 against the Atlanta Falcons on Thanksgiving Day, Davenport sacked Matt Ryan twice, one of which was a strip sack that was recovered by teammate Vonn Bell, in the 26–18 win. On December 11, 2019, Davenport was placed on injured reserve with a foot injury. He finished the season with 31 tackles, six sacks, and three forced fumbles through 13 starts.

2020
In Week 7 against the Carolina Panthers, Davenport recorded his first sack of the season on former Saints' teammate Teddy Bridgewater during the 27–24 win.

2021
The Saints exercised the fifth-year option on Davenport's contract on April 29, 2021. The option guarantees a salary of $9.5 million for the 2022 season. He was placed on injured reserve on September 17, 2021 with a shoulder injury. He was activated on October 25.

Minnesota Vikings
On March 15, 2023, Davenport signed a one-year, $13 million contract with the Minnesota Vikings.

NFL career statistics

References

External links
UTSA Roadrunners bio
New Orleans Saints bio

1996 births
Living people
American football defensive ends
Minnesota Vikings players
New Orleans Saints players
Players of American football from San Antonio
UTSA Roadrunners football players